State Highway 21 (SH-21), also known as the Ponderosa Pine Scenic Byway, is a state highway in Idaho. It runs from Boise to Stanley, primarily as a two-lane road. With two-thirds of its length in Boise County, it passes by historic Idaho City and the village of Lowman to the western edge of the Sawtooth Mountains, then along their northern boundary to Stanley.

The road is designated as one of Idaho's scenic byways and provides access to Sawtooth National Recreation Area from Boise and the Treasure Valley. It primarily follows the Boise River and its tributary Mores Creek to the Boise Basin and beyond, and then the upper South Fork of the Payette River and a tributary from Lowman to Banner Creek Summit.

Route description

The highway is an eastern extension of Gowen Road, which runs along the southern and western perimeter of the Boise Airport (and the Air National Guard's Gowen Field) to connect with Orchard Road at exit 52 of I-84.

After  eastbound from I-84, Highway 21 descends and crosses the New York Canal and Boise River on a bridge constructed in 1996, and connects with Warm Springs Avenue, old SH-21, from east Boise. The highway heads upstream, briefly as a four-lane divided highway, along the north bank of the river in a basalt canyon. The route passes the century-old Boise River Diversion Dam (1909), and several miles later the Lucky Peak Dam, completed in 1955.

Above the Lucky Peak Dam, SH-21 climbs over the Highland Valley Summit, then descends to just above the reservoir. It then crosses the Mores Creek tributary and ascends with it to the Boise Basin gold mining area centered around Idaho City, leaving the sagebrush to enter the Ponderosa pine forest of the Boise National Forest.

At Lowman is the intersection with the Wildlife Canyon Scenic Byway, which descends with the South Fork of the Payette River through a canyon popular for whitewater rafting, westward to Banks at Highway 55. A devastating wildfire ravaged the area around Lowman in 1989; it destroyed  and 26 structures, but without injuries or fatalities.

At the Banner Creek Summit, SH-21 enters Custer County and the Challis National Forest, and descends northward with Banner Creek and Cape Horn Creek, tributaries of the Middle Fork of the Salmon River. At "Cape Horn" the highway turns southeast to gradually climb with Marsh Creek to the border of the Sawtooth National Recreation Area, where SH-21 enters the drainage of the main Salmon River, and gently descends to Stanley.

North of the intersection in Stanley, Highway 75 becomes the Salmon River Scenic Byway, and continues due north for a mile, then veers east with the twisty main Salmon River as it descends to Clayton, then north towards Challis, where the route terminates and rejoins US-93 just south of the city limits.

The upper elevations of SH-21 are often closed during the winter months.

History
Portions of the highway originated in the 1860s, as a toll road connecting Boise with the gold mining areas near Idaho City.

SH-21 originally terminated in Downtown Boise by following Warm Springs Avenue along the north side of the Boise River. The state government approved a realignment that truncated the highway at the Gowen Road interchange on I-84 in 1980. A temporary routing was used while a new four-lane highway between the freeway and SH-21 near Lucky Peak Dam was planned in the 1980s. The realigned SH-21 would also serve an expanded Micron Technology facility and residential development on land owned by the J.R. Simplot Company. The new bridge over the Boise River began construction in March 1995 and was opened the following year. The former alignment was transferred to the Ada County Highway District on February 1, 1997.

Major intersections

See also

 List of state highways in Idaho

References

External links

 Visit Idaho - Ponderosa Pine Scenic Byway

021
Transportation in Ada County, Idaho
Transportation in Boise County, Idaho
Transportation in Custer County, Idaho